Banff Castle is a ruined former royal castle near Banff, Aberdeenshire, Scotland.

History
Built as a motte and bailey castle in the 12th century and held by the Comyns, Earl of Buchan. The castle was visited by King Edward I of England in 1296 and also in 1298 after defeating William Wallace at the Battle of Falkirk during the Wars of Scottish Independence. The castle was garrisoned with English troops until being captured by the Scots in 1310. It came into the possession of the Sharps, before being sold to Lord Ogilvy of Deskford in 1722. The castle then passed into the hands of the Russells.

The old castle was demolished and a mansion house designed by architect John Adam was built in 1750. The remains of the old castle are a scheduled ancient monument.

Current house
The current house is a Category A listed building. It serves as a community and arts venue for the town of Banff and the surrounding areas.

References

References

External links
 

Castles in Aberdeenshire
Category A listed buildings in Aberdeenshire
Scheduled Ancient Monuments in Aberdeenshire
Castle, Banff